Rick Cassata (born November 17, 1947) is an American former gridiron football quarterback who played seven seasons in the Canadian Football League (CFL) for five different teams. He led the Ottawa Rough Riders to victory in the 61st Grey Cup. He also played with The Hawaiians in the World Football League (WFL) in 1975. He played at Tonawanda High School before playing college football at Syracuse University. In 2002, he was inducted into the Greater Buffalo Sports Hall of Fame.

References

External links
 Career stats

1947 births
Living people
American football quarterbacks
American players of Canadian football
BC Lions players
Canadian football quarterbacks
Hamilton Tiger-Cats players
The Hawaiians players
Ottawa Rough Riders players
Saskatchewan Roughriders players
Syracuse Orange football players
Winnipeg Blue Bombers players
Sportspeople from Buffalo, New York
Players of American football from Buffalo, New York